TFOX (born Travis Ian Fox) is an American singer-songwriter, multi-instrumentalist, and record producer.

Early life
Travis Ian Fox was born June 27, 1979, in Washington D.C. to working-class parents.  He has two older sisters.  In his parents spare time they started and played in several bands which performed top 40 music. His mother was the lead singer and his father the manager.  It was at this time TFOX was exposed to several genres of music.  Before he could read or write, TFOX learned to play drums and by the age of 7, he would fill in during rehearsals. At this same time the advent of MTV swept the nation and groups like A-Ha, Human League, Spandau Ballet, and The Clash curiously caught TFOX's attention.

While TFOX was attending Gar-Field Senior High School in Woodbridge, Virginia, he was often ribbed by his peers for listening to "old school" music, which consisted principally of Stevie Wonder, Prince, and Maze featuring Frankie Beverly. These artists peaked TFOX's burgeoning musical interests at the time.  As his musical interests matured, TFOX devoted a great deal of time to listening to and studying the likes of musical pioneers such as Tony! Toni! Toné!, A Tribe Called Quest, Meshell Ndegeocello, Pete Rock and CL Smooth, The Pharcyde, and D’Angelo.

TFOX's music has been inspired by soul, funk, rock, hip-hop, blues, psychedelic, folk and jazz.  His artistic inspirations include Antonio Carlos Jobim, The Beatles, J Dilla, Todd Rundgren, Giorgio Morricone, Ben Folds, Radiohead, Danny Elfman, Joni Mitchell, James Brown and Parliament Funkadelic.

Career
TFOX began composing tracks for what was going to be his debut album in 1999 with only a four track recorder, a snare, a Kawai mini keyboard, and a Rhodes piano.  At this same time, TFOX met his production partner and friend JLaine while attending George Mason University (GMU) and began performing live with JLaine's group UrbanMinds.  Sharing a love for the same types of music, TFOX and JLaine started collaborating.  The production duo came to be known as The Wonderboys.  With the knowledge gained from performing with UrbanMinds and his musical marriage with the veteran JLaine, TFOX began developing his own style.

In 2001, after graduating from GMU with a B.A. in studio art with a concentration in graphic design, TFOX began recording digitally and by 2003, had begun recording tracks that would ultimately become his acclaimed debut album, The Music.  Meanwhile, TFOX was staying busy, earning his break in 2004 co-producing singer-songwriter K’Alyn's third solo album Verse 1, Chapter III, alongside co-executive producers JLaine and K’Alyn.

Working on his first major production gave TFOX the drive to put his own debut album back on track. The Music was released independently in 2006 under TFOX's own production company, Lady Lucy Music.  It attracted a considerable amount of attention from music lovers globally and was his coming out to the music world.

Production

Since the release of The Music, TFOX has been making a name for himself as an accredited and sought-after producer.  He joined JLaine and Wes Felton to form the group Antithesis.  TFOX produced several tracks for the Antithesis debut and the follow-up, Love Daze.  He is also producing tracks for Alison Carney, France-based company ApolloJazz, and for the Wonderboys album, The Professionals.
In 2010 he has followed up his debut with the release of The Great Junction on Tasteful Licks Records. TFOX plays all the instruments on the record and has produced it himself.

Discography
Production credits

References

External links
 Official website
 TFox on Myspace.com
 TFox on Last.fm

American singer-songwriters
American rock songwriters
American rock singers
Living people
1979 births
21st-century American singers